Asherville is an unincorporated community in Stoddard County, in the U.S. state of Missouri.

History
A post office called Asherville was established in 1872, and remained in operation until 1927. The community was named after a pioneer citizen.

In 1925, Asherville had 116 inhabitants.

References

Unincorporated communities in Stoddard County, Missouri
Unincorporated communities in Missouri
1872 establishments in Missouri